The Ateneo de Ponce (English: Ponce Atheneum) is a nonprofit, civic, non governmental organization located in Ponce, Puerto Rico, that seeks to preserve and promote Ponce's cultural traditions. The institution, founded on 15 September 1956, by Dr. Ramón Zapata Acosta, is one of Ponce's chief cultural institutions.

Location
The Ponce Atheneum does not have a permanent physical brick-and-mortar location. It operates out of donated space at either the Pontifical Catholic University of Puerto Rico or the Museo de Arte de Ponce for its meetings and symposiums.

History
The mission of the Ateneo de Ponce is to preserve and promote the culture of the sciences, literature and the arts. To achieve its mission, on 15 September 1956, the Atheneum was formed and memorialized via an inaugural ball. There were 111 co-founding partners led by Dr. Ramón Zapata, who was the president of the Atheneum during several terms. To achieve its objectives the Atheneum organizes a variety of activities such as dissertations, conferences, tournaments, publications, concerts, and various other presentations. Dr. Zapata Acosta is recognized at Ponce's Tricentennial Park for his contributions in the field of literature. It emerged as a result of the cultural resurgence in the city starting in the 1940s, and accelerated by the physical, demographic, industrial, commercial, and financial development that followed.

Organization
The Atheneum is made up of five sections: social sciences, physical sciences and mathematics, history, literature, and fine arts. The administrative staff consists of the members of the Governing Board, which has nine members: president, vice president, secretary, treasurer, the presidents of the five sections. As of 2007, the Atheneum had 60 regular members in its roster.

Its current (November 2010) officers are:
 Dr. José R. Escabí – President
 Prof. Ada Hilda Martínez de Alicea – Vice President
 Prof. María Isabel Chaparro de Escabí – Secretary
 Prof. Lesbia Cruz – Treasurer
 Attorney Roberto García - President, Social Sciences section
 Dr. Arnaldo Carrasquillo Jiménez - President, Physical, Natural Sciences, and Mathematics section
 Prof. Iván Torres Hoyos - President, History section
 Prof. Estela García - President, Literature section
 Prof. Vidalina Rodríguez Carreras - President, Fine Arts section
 Dr. Carlos Zapata – Member
 Attorney Gilda Wilson - Member
 Prof. Antonio Sajid López - Member
 Prof. Migdalia González - Member
 Dr. Arnaldo Carrasquillo - Member
 Prof. José Raúl Cepeda - Member

See also

Ateneo Puertorriqueño

References

External links
 
 

Puerto Rican culture
Organizations based in Ponce, Puerto Rico
Organizations established in 1956
1956 establishments in Puerto Rico